Paul Vecchiali (28 April 1930 – 18 January 2023) was a French filmmaker and author.

Biography
Vecchiali was born in Ajaccio, Corsica, France. He spent his childhood in Toulon. His family, suspected of collaboration, preferred to leave this city after the war.

His cinema took as a starting point the French cinema of the 1930s, with an experimental and autobiographical tone. His best-known films are arguably Rosa la rose and Encore. His films were notably low-budget.

In 1987, he became the first director to link AIDS to homosexuality in a French film with his film Encore.

Vecchiali died in Paris on 18 January 2023, at the age of 92.

Filmography
Les Ruses du diable (1965)
L'Étrangleur (1972)
Femmes Femmes (1974)
Change pas de main (1975)
La Machine (1977)
Corps à cœur (1978)
That's Life (C'est la vie) (1981)
At the Top of the Stairs (1983)
Rosa la rose, fille publique (1985)
Encore / Once More (1988)
The Guys in the Cafe (1989)
Wonder Boy (1994)
Zone Franche (1996)
Love Reinvented (1997)
Tears of AIDS (1999)
A Vot' Bon Cœur (2004)
A Diagonal Portrait of Paul Vecchiali (2005)
Le Cancre (2016)

Bibliography
Vesperales (2008)

References

External links
 

1930 births
2023 deaths
French film directors
French male screenwriters
French screenwriters
French film critics
École Polytechnique alumni
Officiers of the Ordre des Arts et des Lettres
People from Ajaccio